John Joe Cowdery (February 11, 1930 – July 13, 2013) was a Republican member of the Alaska Senate, representing the O District from 2001 through 2008. He was previously a member of the Alaska House of Representatives from 1982 through 1984, and from 1997 through 2000.

Corruption
In 2008 Cowdery was indicted on charges of conspiracy and bribery for his actions in attempting to bribe another senator, Donny Olsen, to support a proposal, favored by executives in Alaska's oil industry, concerning oil leases and petroleum production taxes. Olson was the only Democratic legislator known to have been offered an illegal bribe, and the only officeholder who turned it down.

In 2009 Cowdery was sentenced to six months in home confinement and fined $25,000.

In January 2008, in poor health and under investigation, he indicated that he would decline to file for reelection.

Personal life
Originally from Adrian, Missouri, he and his wife Juanita had one child. He died July 13, 2013, at the age of 83.

See also
 Alaska political corruption probe

References

External links
 Alaska State Legislature - Senator John Cowdery official government website
 Project Vote Smart - Senator John Cowdery (AK) profile
 Follow the Money - John J Cowdery
 2006 2004 2002 2000 1998 1996 campaign contributions
 John Cowdery at 100 Years of Alaska's Legislature

1930 births
2013 deaths
21st-century American politicians
Alaska politicians convicted of crimes
Republican Party Alaska state senators
American construction businesspeople
American politicians convicted of bribery
Businesspeople from Anchorage, Alaska
Deaths from cancer in Alaska
Republican Party members of the Alaska House of Representatives
Politicians from Anchorage, Alaska
People from Adrian, Missouri
Politicians convicted of program bribery
20th-century American businesspeople